The Niagara International Tennis Tournament was a tennis tournament held in Niagara-on-the-Lake, Canada between 1885 and 1923. The tournament was played on outdoor grass courts at the Queen's Royal Hotel and was held in the second half of August. In the final year, 1923, the tournament was held on the courts of the Clifton Hotel.

Champions

Men's singles

Women's singles

References

Grass court tennis tournaments
Recurring sporting events established in 1893
Defunct tennis tournaments in Canada
Recurring sporting events disestablished in 1923
1885 establishments in Ontario
1923 disestablishments in Ontario
Tennis in Ontario